is a businessperson and a former Japanese voice actress. Among her most noteworthy roles are Megu-chan in Majokko Megu-chan, Monsley in Future Boy Conan, Maria Grace Fleed in UFO Robo Grendizer, Michiru in Getter Robo, Klara in Heidi, Girl of the Alps, Rosalie Lamorliere in The Rose of Versailles, Miwa Uzuki in Steel Jeeg, Kurama in Urusei Yatsura, and Machiko in Maicchingu Machiko-sensei. She retired from voice acting in 1998.

Filmography

Television animation
Doraemon (1973) as Jamako
Alps no Shōjo Heidi (1974) as Klara Sesemann
Urusei Yatsura (1981) as Kurama
Maicching Machiko-sensei (1981) as Machiko
Ai Shōjo Pollyanna Monogatari (1986) as Della
Ozu no Mahōtsukai (1986) as Billina
City Hunter (1987) as Angel Heart (ep. 25)
Oishinbo (1991) as Teruko
GeGeGe no Kitaro (1996)

Unknown date
Animation Kiko Marco Polo no Boken (xxxx) as Oruje
Arrow Emblem Grand Prix no Taka (xxxx) as Katori Rie
Attack on Tomorrow (xxxx) as Asuka Ichijo
Azuki-chan (xxxx) as Shino
Blue Seed (xxxx) as Willow Tree (voice of)
Bosco Daiboken (xxxx) as Damia
Detective Conan (xxxx) as Eiko (ep 19)
Conan, the Boy in Future as Monsley
Cutey Honey (xxxx) as Aki Natsuko "Natchan"
Cyborg 009 (xxxx) as Mici (ep 2)
Gatchaman (xxxx)
Getter Robo (xxxx) as Michiru Saotome
Getter Robo G (xxxx) as Michiru Saotome
Goliath the Super Fighter (xxxx) as Kida
Henbe (xxxx) as Uchiki Youko
High School! Kimengumi (xxxx) as Sae Uru (2nd Voice); Tetsuko Kitaiwa
Hyoga Senshi Gaislugger (xxxx) as Reiko Shiki
Ikkyū-san (xxxx) as Yayoi
Katri, Girl of the Meadows (xxxx) as Hanna
Kindaichi Shōnen no Jikenbo (xxxx) as Kahoru Takigawa (ep 7-9)
Kingyo Chuuihou! (xxxx) as Chitose's mother
Kotetsu Zieg (xxxx) as Miwa Uzuki
Kuso Kagaku Sekai Gulliver Boy (xxxx) as Hallelujah / Necromancer
Kyoryu Wakusei (xxxx) as Rei
La Seine no Hoshi (xxxx) as Angélique
Little Prince Cedie (xxxx) as Sarah
Lucy of the Southern Rainbow (xxxx) as Kate
Lupin III (xxxx) as Lisa (ep 11)
Lupin III: Part II (xxxx) as Claudia (ep 133); Margarette (ep 72); Willhelm Briria (ep 102)Machine Hayabusa (xxxx) as Sakura NishionjiMajokko Megu-chan (1974-1975) as Megu KanzakiMajokko Tickle (xxxx) as TickleMama wa Shougaku Yonensei (xxxx) as MiraiManga Nihon Emaki (xxxx)Mazinger Z (xxxx)Meiken Jolie (xxxx)Mon Cheri CoCo (xxxx)Mori no Tonto-tachi (xxxx) as ElmiMusashi no Ken (xxxx) as Kayo NatsukiMuu no Hakugei (xxxx) as MadooraO-bake no... Holly (xxxx) as MajolineOniisama E... (xxxx) as Hisako Shinobu (Mariko's Mother)Oyoneko Boonyan (xxxx) as ArereMobile Police Patlabor (xxxx) as TakayamaSamurai Giants (xxxx) as Yuki BanjouSentou Mecha Xabungle (xxxx) as Karone (eps 35-37)Serendipity Monogatari: Pyua-tou no Nakama-tachi (xxxx) as MintaShinzo Ningen Casshan (xxxx)Smart-san (xxxx) as TamakiSteel Jeeg (xxxx) as Miwa UzukiStory of the Alps: My Annette (xxxx) as MarieSuper Dimension Century Orguss (xxxx) as TinaTakarajima (xxxx) as LilyThe Perrine Story (xxxx)The Rose of Versailles (xxxx) as RosalieTime Bokan (xxxx)Time Patrol-Tai Otasukeman (xxxx)Tonde Mon Pe (xxxx) as Maki KanouTransformers: Masterforce (xxxx) as MegaTsurikichi Sampei (xxxx) as Helen WatsonUchuu Kaizoku Captain Harlock (xxxx) as EmeraldaUchuu Taitei God Sigma (xxxx) as MinakoUchuusen Sagittarius (xxxx)Ultraman: The Adventure Begins (xxxx) as SusanUmi no Triton (xxxx)Wakusei Robo Dangard A (xxxx) as LisaWansa-kun (xxxx)Watashi to Watashi: Futari no Lotte (xxxx) as MotherWedding Peach (xxxx) as JuraX-Bomber (Puppet-Show TV) as Bloody MaryYatterman (xxxx)Zendaman (xxxx)

Original video animation (OVA)Gall Force 2 - Destruction (xxxx) as JourneyGall Force 3 - Stardust War (xxxx) as JourneyGenesis Survivor Gaiarth (xxxx) as Ayatolla (Ep 3)Gude Crest (xxxx) as Holy Supreme MotherHans Christian Andersen's The Little Mermaid (xxxx) as Princess CeciliaIczer Reborn (xxxx) as GolemNayuta (xxxx) as SozSlayers Special (xxxx) as JosephineSohryuden: Legend of the Dragon Kings (xxxx) as Toba SaekoCompiler (1994) as Upload

Animated filmsNausicaä of the Valley of the Wind (1984) as Girl C; Teto

Unknown dateGaraga (movie) as MinGetter Robo (movie) as Michiru SaotomeGreat Mazinger tai Getter Robo (movie) as Michiru SaotomeGreat Mazinger tai Getter Robo G - Kuuchuu Dai-Gekitotsu (movie) as Michiru SaotomeGrendizer - Getter Robo G - Great Mazinger Kessen! Daikaijuu (movie) as Michiru SaotomeKindaichi Shōnen no Jikenbo (movie) as SaekiLupin III: The Legend of the Gold of Babylon (movie) as ZakskayaMirai Shōnen Conan Tokubetsu Hen-Kyodaiki Gigant no Fukkatsu (movie) as MonsleySailor Moon SuperS: The Movie as Queen BadianeUFO Robo Grendizer (movie) as MariaUrusei Yatsura: Only You (movie) as Princess Kurama

Dubbing

Live-action
 Back to the Future Part III: Clara Clayton (Mary Steenburgen)
 Cliffhanger (1997 NTV edition): Kristel (Caroline Goodall)
 Death and the Maiden: Paulina Escobar (Sigourney Weaver)
 Die Hard (1992 Fuji TV edition): Holly Gennero-McClane (Bonnie Bedelia)
 Die Hard 2 (1992 Fuji TV edition): Holly Gennero-McClane (Bonnie Bedelia)
 Family Business: Elaine McMullen (Rosanna DeSoto)
 Ghostbusters II (1992 Fuji TV edition): Dana Barrett (Sigourney Weaver)
 Indiana Jones and the Temple of Doom: Willie Scott (Kate Capshaw)
 Kramer vs. Kramer: Phyllis Bernard (JoBeth Williams)
 Life with Mikey: Geena Briganti (Cyndi Lauper)
 Look Who's Talking: Mollie Jensen (Kirstie Alley)
 Look Who's Talking Too: Mollie Ubriacco (Kirstie Alley)
 Look Who's Talking Now: Mollie Ubriacco (Kirstie Alley)
 Mars Attacks!: First Lady Marsha Dale (Glenn Close)
 Matilda: Agatha Trunchbull (Pam Ferris)
 Near Dark: Diamondback (Jenette Goldstein)
 Only You (Kate Corvatch (Bonnie Hunt))
 She-Devil: Ruth Patchett (Roseanne Barr)
 Terminator 2: Judgment Day (1993 Fuji TV edition): Sarah Connor (Linda Hamilton)
 Top Gun (1989 Fuji TV edition): Charlotte "Charlie" Blackwood (Kelly McGillis)

Animation
 Biker Mice from Mars: Charly
 Disney's Adventures of the Gummi Bears: Grammi Gummi
 G.I. Joe: The Movie: Pythona
 Police Academy: Debbie Callahan
 The Rescuers: Madame Medusa
 The Simpsons: Mona Simpson (one episode)
 A Troll in Central Park: Rosie
 X-Men'': Storm

References

External links
 
 Rihoko Yoshida at GamePlaza-Haruka Voice Acting Database 
 Rihoko Yoshida at Hitoshi Doi's Seiyuu Database 

1949 births
Living people
Japanese voice actresses
Voice actresses from Tokyo
Aoni Production voice actors